Raozhou or Rao Prefecture (饒州) was a zhou (prefecture) in imperial China centering on modern Poyang County, Jiangxi, China in northeastern Jiangxi at the southeastern shore of the Poyang Lake. In the Yuan, Ming and Qing dynasties it was known as Raozhou Prefecture (饒州路 or 饒州府).

References
 

Prefectures of the Sui dynasty
Prefectures of the Tang dynasty
Prefectures of Yang Wu
Prefectures of Southern Tang
Prefectures of the Song dynasty
Prefectures of the Yuan dynasty
Prefectures of the Ming dynasty
Prefectures of the Qing dynasty
Former prefectures in Jiangxi